HD 15115 is a single star in the equatorial constellation of Cetus. It is readily visible in binoculars or a small telescope, but is considered too dim to be seen with the naked eye at an apparent visual magnitude of 6.76. The distance to this object is 160 light years based on parallax, and it is slowly drifting further away at the rate of about 1 km/s. It has been proposed as a member of the Beta Pictoris moving group or the Tucana-Horologium association of co-moving stars; there is some ambiguity as to its true membership.

This object has a stellar classification of F4IV, suggesting it is an aging subgiant star that has exhausted the supply of hydrogen at its core. MacGregor and associates (2015) instead classify it as a young F-type main-sequence star with a class of F2V. It has 1.19 times the mass of the Sun, 1.39 times the Sun's radius, and has a relatively high rate of spin with a projected rotational velocity of 90 km/s. The star is radiating 3.74 times the luminosity of the Sun from its photosphere at an effective temperature of 6,811 K. Its metallicity – the abundance of elements other than hydrogen and helium – is nearly the same as in the Sun.

HD 15115 was shown to have an asymmetric debris disk surrounding it, which is being viewed nearly edge-on. The reason for the asymmetry is thought to be either the gravitational pull of a passing star (HIP 12545), an exoplanet, or interaction with the local interstellar medium. A magnitude 11.35 visual companion lies at an angular separation of  along a position angle of 195°, as of 2015.

References

F-type subgiants
F-type main-sequence stars
Beta Pictoris moving group
Circumstellar disks

Cetus (constellation)
Durchmusterung objects
015115
011360